The following radio stations broadcast on AM frequency 670 kHz: 670 AM is a United States clear-channel frequency. WSCR Chicago and KDLG Dillingham, Alaska, share Class A status of 670 kHz.

In Argentina
 LU9 in Mar del Plata, Bs. As.
 LRA11 in Comodoro Rivadavia, Chubut
 LRA52 in Chos Malal, Neuquen
 LT4 in Posadas, Misiones

In Cuba
 Radio Rebelde (broadcasts from multiple locations on this frequency)
 Radio Enciclopedia in Matanzas

In the United States
Stations in bold are clear-channel stations.

External links

 FCC list of stations on 670 kHz

References

Lists of radio stations by frequency